John Owen Lowe (born 1995) is an American writer, producer and actor.

Early life
John Owen Lowe is the son of make-up artist Sheryl Berkof and actor Rob Lowe, he graduated in science technology from Stanford University in 2018. He has an older brother named Mathew who works as a lawyer.

Career
From 2015, Lowe appeared in a recurring role in comedy series The Grinder. In 2017, he appeared on The Lowe Files, in which his family explored unsolved mysteries. He appeared in the Christmas film Holiday in the Wild in 2019, and worked as a writer on multiple episodes of 9-1-1: Lone Star.

In March 2023, Lowe appeared in the Netflix comedy series Unstable, which he also executive-produced alongside his father, and Victor Fresco. The scripted series was reportedly inspired by his relationship on social media with his father.

Personal life
Lowe is a keen pianist. In 2018, following problems
with addiction, he began a sober lifestyle. In 2023, he bought a home in Sherman Oaks previously owned by dancer Derek Hough.

Filmography

References

External links

Living people
1995 births
21st-century American male actors
American people of English descent
American people of German descent
American people of Irish descent
American people of Scottish descent
American people of Welsh descent
American male television actors
American male film actors